= 2018 Academy Awards =

2018 Academy Awards may refer to:

- 90th Academy Awards, the Academy Awards ceremony that took place in 2018, honoring the best in film for 2017
- 91st Academy Awards, the Academy Awards ceremony that took place in 2019, honoring the best in film for 2018
